Leslie Eugene Richard Bailiff (16 August 1877 – 25 July 1948) was an Australian rules footballer who played with Geelong in the Victorian Football League (VFL).

Notes

External links

1877 births
1948 deaths
Australian rules footballers from Victoria (Australia)
Geelong Football Club players
Geelong West Football Club players